The grey-headed fruit dove (Ptilinopus hyogastrus) is a species of bird in the family Columbidae. It is endemic to the northern Moluccas.

Habitat 
Its natural habitat is subtropical or tropical moist lowland forests.

Description 
It is mostly green except for a grey head, red eyes and black yellow-tipped beak.

References

grey-headed fruit dove
Birds of the Maluku Islands
grey-headed fruit dove
Taxonomy articles created by Polbot